Justin Peacock may refer to:

Justin Peacock, character in The Affairs of Martha
Justin Peacock (filmmaker) of Trasharama A-Go-Go